Thomas Hoßmang (born 27 November 1966) is a German former footballer and manager, who last coached 1. FC Magdeburg.

References

External links
Thomas Hoßmang at RSSSF

1966 births
Living people
German footballers
East German footballers
Expatriate footballers in Malaysia
Association football defenders
FC Energie Cottbus players
FC Energie Cottbus II players
Dynamo Dresden players
Dresdner SC players
Terengganu FC players
Rot-Weiss Frankfurt players
Bundesliga players
2. Bundesliga players
DDR-Oberliga players
1. FC Magdeburg managers
3. Liga managers
German football managers
People from Hoyerswerda
Footballers from Saxony
People from Bezirk Dresden